Věra Galatíková (19 August 1938 – 21 December 2007) was a Czech actress. She acted in Pardubice following her studies at the Janáček Academy of Music and Performing Arts. Galatíková then joined The Drama Club in Prague, where she performed between 1967 and 1972, later performing in other Prague venues including the National Theatre. At the 1994 Thalia Awards she won the category of Best Actress in a Play. Galatíková was recognised at the 2000  for her work in film voice dubbing. She died of cancer in 2007.

Selected filmography
The Valley of the Bees (1967)
All My Compatriots (1968)
Smoke on the Potato Fields (1977)
Jako kníže Rohan (1983)
Andel Exit (2000)

References

External links

1938 births
2007 deaths
Deaths from cancer in the Czech Republic
Janáček Academy of Music and Performing Arts alumni
Czech stage actresses
Czechoslovak stage actresses
Czech film actresses
Czechoslovak film actresses
People from Zlín
20th-century Czech actresses
21st-century Czech actresses
Czech voice actresses
Deaths from lung cancer
Recipients of the Thalia Award